
The Trango Towers are a family of rock towers situated in Gilgit-Baltistan, in the north of Pakistan. The Towers offer some of the largest cliffs and most challenging rock climbing in the world, and every year a number of expeditions from all corners of the globe visit Karakoram to climb the difficult granite. They are located north of Baltoro Glacier, and are part of the Baltoro Muztagh, a sub-range of the Karakoram range.

Structure of the group

All of the Trango Towers lie on a ridge, roughly northwest–southeast, between the Trango Glacier on the west and the Dunge Glacier on the east. Great Trango itself is a large massif, with four identifiable summits: Main, South or Southwest, East, and West. It is a complex combination of steep snow/ice gullies, steeper rock faces, and vertical to overhanging headwalls, topped by a snowy ridge system.

Just northwest of Great Trango is the Trango Tower, often called "Nameless Tower". This is a very large, pointed, rather symmetrical spire which juts  out of the ridgeline. North of Trango Tower is a smaller rock spire known as "Trango Monk." To the north of this feature, the ridge becomes less rocky and loses the large granite walls that distinguish the Trango Towers group and make them so attractive to climbers; however the summits do get higher. These summits are not usually considered part of the Trango Towers group, though they share the Trango name. Trango II lies northwest of the Monk, and the highest summit on the ridge, Trango Ri, lies northwest of Trango II.

Just southeast of Great Trango (really a part of its southeast ridge) is the Trango Pulpit, whose walls present similar climbing challenges to those of Great Trango itself. Further, to the south is Trango Castle, the last large peak along the ridge before the Baltoro Glacier.

Climbing history

Overall, the Trango Towers group has seen some of the most difficult and significant climbs ever accomplished, due to the combination of altitude, total height of the routes, and the steepness of the rock. All of the routes are highly technical climbs.

Great Trango

1977 South Face. Great Trango was first climbed in 1977 by Galen Rowell, John Roskelley, Kim Schmitz, Jim Morrissey and Dennis Hennek by a route which started from the west side (Trango Glacier), and climbed a combination of ice ramps and gullies with rock faces, finishing on the upper South Face.
1984 Northwest Face. Another long alpine route on Great Trango is on the Northwest Face, and was climbed in 1984 by Andy Selters and Scott Woolums. This is a long technical alpine climb with extensive rock and ice climbing.

Big Walls:
1984 East Face. The east face of Great Trango was first climbed (to the East Summit) in 1984 by the Norwegians Hans Christian Doseth and Finn Dæhli, who both died on the descent.
1992 The Grand Voyage (VII 5.10 A4+ WI3), duration 18 days. The first successful climb of and return from the East Summit was in 1992, by Xaver Bongard and John Middendorf, via "The Grand Voyage", a route parallel to that of the ill-fated Norwegians, and the only route ever completed up the 1,340m east-southeast headwall. These two climbs have been called "perhaps the hardest big-wall climbs in the world."
1999 Parallel Worlds (VII 5.11 A4). Alex Lowe, Mark Synnott, Jared Ogden, duration 28 days

Trango (Nameless) Tower

Trango (Nameless) Tower was first climbed in 1976 by the British climber Joe Brown, along with Mo Anthoine, Martin Boysen, and Malcolm Howells. There are at least eight separate routes to the summit.

After several unsuccessful attempts, the second and third ascents were achieved in 1987, with the opening of two new routes:
The Slovenian Route, better known as the Yugoslav Route, a pure, clean, logical crack route on the south-southeast face, by Slavko Cankar,  and Bojan Šrot, and the Great Overhanging Dihedral Route, a spectacular and technical ascent on the western pillar, by Swiss/French team Michel "Tchouky" Fauquet, Patrick Delale, Michel Piola and Stephane Schaffter.

The first route that was freed (using fixed lines to return to a base each night), in 1988, was the Yugoslav Route by German team Kurt Albert, Wolfgang Güllich and Hartmut Münchenbach.

Another notable route is Eternal Flame (named after a Bangles song), first climbed on 20 September 1989 by Kurt Albert, Wolfgang Güllich, Milan Sykora and Christoph Stiegler. This route ascends the South-East Face of the Tower, and was climbed almost entirely free.
These climbs inaugurated an era of pure rock-climbing techniques and aesthetics on high-altitude peaks.

The first female ascent, on 6 September 1990, was achieved in free climbing style, again on the Yugoslav Route, by Catherine Destivelle (with Jeff Lowe, and David Breashears filming).

In summer 2009, Franz Hinterbrandner, Mario Walder and  Alexander and Thomas Huber did the first free ascent of Eternal Flame.

Other summits

The West summit of Great Trango and the Trango Pulpit were both first climbed in 1999. The West summit was climbed by two separate teams, one American and one Russian, almost simultaneously, by parallel routes. The American team of Alex Lowe, Jared Ogden, and Mark Synnott climbed a long, bold, highly technical line which they called "Parallel Worlds." They reported difficulties up to 5.11 and A4. The Russian team of Igor Potan'kin, Alexandr Odintsov, Ivan Samoilenko and Yuri Koshelenko climbed an equally proud route (Eclissi) and encountered similar technical challenges. Both climbs were nominated for the prestigious Piolet d'or award in 1999. The north east face on the Pulpit was climbed by a Norwegian team ("Norwegian Direct", Robert Caspersen, Gunnar Karlsen, Per L. Skjerven, and Einar Wold) over a total of 38 days on the wall. The team reported of difficulties up to A4/5.11.
Another route over Trango Pulpit is More Czech Less Slovak route VII 7-UIAA A2 (Southeast Ridge). It was climbed by a 1999 Czechoslovak team (Ivo Wondracek, Tomas Rinn, Pavel Weisser, Jaro Dutka, and Michal Drasar).

BASE jump

This was the highest starting elevation for a BASE jump on record. On 10 August 2013 Andrey Lebedev and Vladimir Murzaev performed a base jump from the same location as Feteris and Singleman on a low budget and with little fanfare.

Recent ascents

Some more recent ascents on Great Trango have focused on the longer routes found on the west and south sides. In particular, in 2004 Josh Wharton and Kelly Cordes completed a new, very long route on the Southwest Ridge, or Azeem Ridge, to the Southwest Summit. Though not as extremely technical as the East Face routes, the climb was notable for the extremely lightweight and fast (5 days) style in which it was done.

Over 7 days in August 2005, two Slovak climbers, Gabo Cmarik and Jozef Kopold, climbed a new route, which they termed Assalam Alaikum, to the right of the Wharton/Cordes line on the south face of Great Trango. The climb comprised around 90 pitches, up to 5.11d A2. They used a lightweight style similar to that of Wharton and Cordes.

In the same month, Samuel Johnson, Jonathon Clearwater and Jeremy Frimer made the first ascent of the southwest ridge of Trango II, which they termed Severance Ridge. The route involved 1,600 m of climbing over five days, with rock climbing up to 5.11 A2 and ice and mixed climbing up to AI3 M5.

During May/June 2008, the Norwegian route on the east face of Great Trango (1984) was repeated by the four Norwegian climbers Rolf Bae, Bjarte Bø, Sigurd Felde and Stein-Ivar Gravdal, spending 27 days in the wall to reach the summit, and three more days for the descent. This is reportedly the first repetition of the route, and thus also the first successful ascent and return.  Rolf Bae died later that summer. He was one of 11 climbers who were killed in the 2008 K2 disaster.

In mid August 2009, Alexander and Thomas Huber managed to make an all free ascent of "Eternal Flame" on Nameless Tower, with climbing up to French grade 7c+.

See also

 Mount Thor
 Cerro Torre
 Trango Glacier
 Hainablak Glacier
 List of mountains in Pakistan
 List of highest mountains

References

External links
 Pakistan Alpine Institute  Anne Arran
 Pakistan's First Big Wall Climbing Expedition 2013  Imran Junaidi 
 Article about the 2008 expedition from D2 / Dagens Næringsliv (Norwegian)

Recent ascents
 Trango Towers Group Tomaz Jakofcic 
 Great Trango Tower, Northwest Face Vladimir Mogila 
 Nameless Tower, Eternal Flame Denis Burdet 

Baltistan
Cliffs of Pakistan
Climbing areas of Pakistan
Mountains of Gilgit-Baltistan
Mountain ranges of the Karakoram